Hogwash or hog wash may refer to:
Pig swill, food for pigs in liquid or partly liquid form
Slang for "nonsense", communication that lacks any coherent meaning

Albums, songs, and books
Hogwash (album), 1972 blues-rock album by UK band the Groundhogs
"Hog Wash", 1953 song by American musician Louis Jordan
"Hogwash", song on 1994 album The Tussler – Original Motion Picture Soundtrack by Norwegian band Motorpsycho
"Hogwash", song on 1997 album The Action Is Go by American band Fu Manchu
The Hog's Wholey Wash, 2002 book by Mal Mitchell
Hog Wash, 2010 book by American musician Bryan Duncan